Edward Hills Wason (September 2, 1865 – February 6, 1941) was a U.S. Representative from New Hampshire.

Born in New Boston, New Hampshire, Wason attended public and private schools and Francestown Academy. He was graduated from the New Hampshire College of Agriculture and the Mechanic Arts at Hanover in 1886 and from Boston University School of Law in 1890. He was admitted to the bar in 1890 and commenced practice in Nashua, New Hampshire.

Wason was sergeant at arms, assistant clerk, and later clerk of the New Hampshire Senate. He served as member of the Nashua Board of Education 1891-1895, serving as its president in 1895. He was city solicitor of Nashua in 1894 and 1895, and served as president of the common council in 1897 and 1898.  He was an alderman of Nashua, 1906-1908.

He served in the New Hampshire House of Representatives in 1899, 1909, and 1913, and as member of the state constitutional conventions in 1902 and 1912. He served as solicitor of Hillsborough County, 1903-1907. He served as president of the Citizens' Guaranty Savings Bank of Nashua, 1904–1941, and
he also engaged in agricultural pursuits in Merrimack from 1906 to 1941.

Wason was elected as a Republican to the Sixty-fourth and to the eight succeeding Congresses (March 4, 1915 – March 3, 1933). He was not a candidate for renomination in 1932. He retired from public life in 1933 and resided on his estate near New Boston, where he died February 6, 1941. He was interred in New Boston Cemetery.

References

1865 births
1941 deaths
American bankers
Republican Party members of the New Hampshire House of Representatives
University of New Hampshire alumni
Boston University School of Law alumni
Republican Party members of the United States House of Representatives from New Hampshire
People from New Boston, New Hampshire
People from Nashua, New Hampshire